The Discovery Stakes is an American Thoroughbred horse race held annually during the latter part of November at Aqueduct Racetrack in Queens, New York. A Listed  event open to three-year-old horses, it is contested on dirt over a distance of one and one eighth miles (nine furlongs).

In its 72nd running in 2016, the race honors the great thoroughbred Discovery, the 1935 American Horse of the Year owned and raced by Alfred G. Vanderbilt II.  In the list of the top 100 U.S. thoroughbred champions of the 20th Century by Blood-Horse magazine, Discovery ranks 37th.

Based at Aqueduct, the Discovery Handicap was inaugurated at Belmont Park where it was run from 1945–1958, and again in 1960–1961, 1968–1970. In one year, 1974, the race was run in two divisions. In 2005 it was contested at a distance of a mile and one sixteenth.  The largest winning margin was 9 1/4 lengths.

Records
Speed record (at 1 1/8 miles):
 1:47 1/5 – Forego (1973)
 1:47.30 – Left Bank (2000)

Most wins by a jockey:
 5 – Ángel Cordero Jr. (1974 (2×), 1979, 1980, 1988)
 5 – John Velazquez (1999, 2000, 2005, 2006, 2007)
 5 – Joel Rosario (2012, 2016, 2017, 2018, 2019)

Most wins by a trainer:
 5 – Todd A. Pletcher (1998, 2000, 2005, 2006, 2015)

Most wins by an owner:
 3 – Harbor View Farm (1964, 1965, 1974)

Winners

* †  In 1966, Ring Twice finished first, but was disqualified.

References

 History of the Discovery Handicap at the NYRA

Graded stakes races in the United States
Horse races in New York (state)
Flat horse races for three-year-olds
Recurring sporting events established in 1945
Aqueduct Racetrack
1945 establishments in New York City